The North Sea Fisheries Convention, officially known as the International Convention for regulating the police of the North Sea fisheries outside territorial waters, was a treaty that was signed on May 6, 1882. The inaugural conference was intended to provide a set of regulations for North Sea fisheries. The High Contracting Parties, which included Great Britain, Germany, Denmark, Netherlands, Belgium and France, entered the convention for a period of five years. 

The convention, which operated only outside the three-mile limit from land, was defined as follows: 
The fishermen of each country shall enjoy the exclusive right of fishery within the distance of 3 (nautical) miles (5.56 km) from low-water mark along the whole extent of the coasts of their respective countries, as well as of the dependent islands and banks.
As regards bays, the distance of 3 miles (5.56 km) shall be measured from a straight line drawn across the bay, in the part nearest the entrance, at the first point, where the width does not exceed 10 miles (18.5 km).
The present article shall not in any way prejudice the freedom of navigation and anchorage in territorial waters accorded to fishing boats, provided they conform to the special police regulations enacted by the powers to whom the shore belongs.

A supplementary convention was signed at The Hague on November 16, 1887, among the same High Contracting Parties, relating to  liquor traffic in the North Sea. It applies to the area set out in article 4 of the Convention of IV, May 6, 1882, and forbids the sale of spirituous liquors within it to persons on board fishing vessels. A reciprocal right of visit and search is granted under this convention to the cruisers entrusted with carrying out of its provisions.

See also
Fisheries Convention
International inspection pennant

References

Further reading
 Bangert, Kaare. "The effective enforcement of high seas fishing regimes: The case of the convention for the regulation of the policing of the north sea fisheries of 6 May 1882." in  The Reality of International Law: Essays in Honour of Ian Brownlie (1999) pp: 1-20.
 Caddell, Richard, and Erik J. Molenaar, eds. Strengthening international fisheries law in an era of changing oceans (Bloomsbury Publishing, 2019).

External links

1880s in the environment
Treaties of the Netherlands
Treaties of Denmark
Treaties of the German Empire
Treaties of the French Third Republic
Treaties of the United Kingdom (1801–1922)
Treaties of Belgium
North Sea
Fisheries treaties
1882 in the Netherlands
1882 treaties
Treaties entered into force in 1884
Fishing in France
Fishing in Germany
Fishing in the Netherlands
Fishing in Denmark
Fishing in the United Kingdom
1887 treaties
1887 in the Netherlands